Carl Ahlberg was a Swedish football player and manager. He played for and managed Malmö FF.

References

Swedish footballers
Swedish football managers
Malmö FF players
Malmö FF managers
Living people
Association footballers not categorized by position
Year of birth missing (living people)